In algebraic geometry, the Quot scheme is a scheme parametrizing locally free sheaves on a projective scheme. More specifically, if X is a projective scheme over a Noetherian scheme S and if F is a coherent sheaf on X, then there is a scheme  whose set of T-points  is the set of isomorphism classes of the quotients of  that are flat over T. The notion was introduced by Alexander Grothendieck.

It is typically used to construct another scheme parametrizing geometric objects that are of interest such as a Hilbert scheme. (In fact, taking F to be the structure sheaf  gives a Hilbert scheme.)

Definition 
For a scheme of finite type  over a Noetherian base scheme , and a coherent sheaf , there is a functorsending  towhere  and  under the projection . Alternatively, there is an equivalent condition of holding . This is called the quot functor which has a natural stratification into a disjoint union of subfunctors, each of which is represented by a projective -scheme called the quot scheme associated to a Hilbert polynomial .

Hilbert polynomial 
For a relatively very ample line bundle  and any closed point  there is a function  sending

This is called the Hilbert polynomial which gives a natural stratification of the quot functor. Note the Hilbert polynomial is independent of the choice of very ample line bundle .

Grothendieck's existence theorem 

Examples

Grassmannian 
Since  is locally free and at every point it represents a -plane, it has the constant Hilbert polynomial . This shows  represents the quot functor

Projective space 
As a special case, we can construct the project space  as the quot schemefor a sheaf  on an -scheme .

Hilbert scheme 
The Hilbert scheme is a special example of the quot scheme.

Example of a parameterization 
There is a sheaf  on  such that for any , there is an associated subscheme  and surjection . This construction represents the quot functor

Quadrics in the projective plane 

Semistable vector bundles on a curve 
Semistable vector bundles on a curve  of genus  can equivalently be described as locally free sheaves of finite rank. Such locally free sheaves  of rank  and degree  have the properties

 
  is generated by global sections

This implies there is a surjectionThen, the quot scheme  parametrizes all such surjections.

See also 

 Hilbert polynomial
 Flat morphism
 Hilbert scheme
 Moduli space
GIT quotient

References

Further reading 
Notes on stable maps and quantum cohomology
https://amathew.wordpress.com/2012/06/02/the-stack-of-coherent-sheaves/

Algebraic geometry